The Hollywood Music in Media Award for Best Original Score in a Feature Film is one of the awards given annually to people working in the motion picture industry by the Hollywood Music in Media Awards (HMMA).

History
It is presented to the composers who have composed the best "original" score, written specifically for a motion picture. The award was first given in 2014, during the fifth annual awards.

Winners and nominees

2010s

2020s

References

Best Original Score in a Feature Film
Film awards for best score